The action of 27 March 1942 was a naval battle fought between the United States and Germany during World War II in the Atlantic Ocean. While patrolling 300 miles off Norfolk, Virginia, an American Q-ship encountered a U-boat and a short surface engagement ensued.

Action

, under Lieutenant Commander Harry Lynnwood Hicks, was originally a merchantman named SS Carolyn which was converted to a Q-ship after America's entry into World War II. Atik displaced 6,610 tons with a crew of 141 men and an armament of four  naval guns, eight machine guns and six K-guns. It was about 5:00 pm on 27 March when  detected Atik. Over two hours later at 19:37, Kapitänleutnant Reinhard Hardegen fired a spread of G7e torpedoes from a surfaced position and one of them struck Atiks bow on port side. The Q-ship caught on fire and started to list slightly. Lieutenant Commander Hicks apparently decided that the only way to lure the U-boat within range of his guns was by ordering a lifeboat to be lowered on the starboard side. The trick worked so when U-123 was maneuvering to starboard, around Atiks stern, she opened fire with all of her weapons, including depth charges. The first shots fell short of the U-boat and the others deflected. The American machine gunners were successful though and the U-boat's bridge was slightly damaged and one German midshipman was mortally wounded.

Immediately after the Americans opened fire, Captain Hardegen ordered his deck gun into action and fled out of Atiks range before diving but at 21:29 U-123 attacked again to finish the Q-ship off. After firing and striking the ship with one more torpedo, Atik still remained mostly afloat with her bow slowly settling. The remainder of the American crew appeared to be evacuating their ship at this point so the Germans deemed her as no longer being a threat and they surfaced at 22:27 pm to watch Atik sink. Twenty-three minutes later at 22:50 Atik exploded and then a gale blew in, killing all of the 141 American sailors. The one German casualty was buried at sea ten minutes later and then U-123 escaped. An SOS was received by three nearby American warships, Q-ship  and fleet tug USS Sagamore—but when they arrived there was nothing but wreckage. American aircraft also searched for several days though nothing but debris and five empty lifeboats were found.

See also
Armed merchantmen

References

Naval battles of World War II involving the United States
Battle of the Atlantic
Naval battles of World War II involving Germany
March 1942 events
Germany–United States military relations